Science Party may refer to:

Science Party (Australia), a political party in Australia
Science Party (UK), a political party in the United Kingdom